Tim Hutchinson (born 9 October 1946) is a British art director and production designer. He was nominated for an Academy Award in the category Best Art Direction for the film Victor/Victoria. He was also nominated for a BAFTA in the category of Design for The Hanging Gale.

Selected filmography
 Victor/Victoria (1982)

References

External links

1946 births
Living people
British art directors
British production designers